Martin Neill Haycock (born 18 September 1973) is a former British international Coxswain (rowing).

Profile
Whilst in education at Abingdon School he was captain of the eights and gained colours for the Abingdon School Boat Club. After leaving Abingdon in 1991 he attended Magdalene College, Cambridge.

Rowing
In 1993 Haycock was selected as the cox for Cambridge at the world renowned Boat Race, finishing on the winning side. A second appearance ensued one year later in 1994, with Haycock once again coxing the winning team.
In addition to the two victories, he represented Great Britain at the 1993 World Student Games in Buffalo, New York, where he coxed the eights to a silver medal.

See also
 List of Old Abingdonians

References

1973 births
Living people
People educated at Abingdon School
British male rowers
English male rowers
Universiade silver medalists for Great Britain
Universiade medalists in rowing